Dr. Krutibas Nayak (born 1955) is an author in India. He writes articles, poems, stories, novels in Oriya. He is a popular leading name in Oriya literature. Nayak has established himself in the field of Children's literature. He is nationally recognized and has received many national and state level recognition.

Nayak was born at an east coast village named Ektala in Rajkanika block of Odisha, India in 1955. He spent his early life in Southern part of Orissa, where he graduated in literature from Berhampur University. Nayak achieved Doctorate degree in 1992 in the field of Children's literature with his thesis named Oriya Shishu Galpara Swaroop O Vikash(Nature and Development of Oriya Children's Stories). During the '80s he edited children's magazine in Odia by names Shishu Nayan, Ame Shishu and Shishu Raija. Shishu Raija was published between 1976 and 1990 from Jeypore in Odisha.

Nayak joined All India Radio in Jeypore, Odisha on 13 December 2012 as Asst. Director and promoted to Station Director on 28 February 2014 and retired on 31 March 2015.

Awards
 17th annual Abhinandanika Award  
 National Award for Hindi writer from non-Hindi speaking area for his novel Shubalakshmi in 2002
 National Award for Children's literature for his children's poem book Phoola Sabu Phutile in 1999
 National Award for Children's literature for his children's novel Banabhoji in 1992
 Vishuba Award in 1986
 Sansar Award (state level) for lifetime achievement in children's literature
 Manika Viswanath Award (state level) for lifetime achievement in children's literature
 Kasturi Award (state level) for his Lyrics
 Srikhetra Samman for his Lyrics
 " Utkala Sahitya Sammana" for his contribution to Oriya Literature in 2011
 Akashvani Annual Award for best production on Women Programme in 2011

Selected works
Nayak has authored more than 100 books (152) to be precise) till date. Here are some of his selected works.

Novels 
 Shubhalakshmi
 Koola Bohu
 Hasakuri Janha

Story collections 
 Sadananda Baunka Sansar
 Sunima Heu
 Tima Fakir
 Prema Purnima

Lyrics 
 Udigale Gendaliya
 Preeti Shatak
 Geeti Shatak
 Bhakti Shatak
 Jeevan Bhagabat
 Prema Preeti Pranaya
 Divya Vani
 Amrut Bachan
 Unnat Jeevan
 Pranaya Jhankara
 Preeti Veena
 Sangeet Suribhi
 Geeti Vichitra
 Odia Jatira Ladhua Veera

Children's literature 
 Bana Bhoji
 Phoola Sabu Phootile
 Maja Gapa
 Aasa Aame Gapa Padhiba
 Dadgua Azanka Maza Kahani
 Kiachhi Maza Kichhi Taza Kahani

Plays 
 Ochha Mahasangha
 Betar Nataka

Byanga Kavita
 Krutibasanka Bibhin Avatar

Biographical 
 Srujana Sanlapa : This is a comprehensive summary of the Literary career and activities of Kruttibas Nayak. Published by Vikash Pratisthan, Jeypore. 
Prerna
Nabam Parba: Bengali Novel written by Swpna Maya Chakravarty based on life style of Kruttibas Nayak, Published by Anand Bazar Publications, Kolkata-1996

References

1955 births
Living people
Writers from Odisha
Indian children's writers